In telecommunications, information transfer is the process of moving messages containing user information from a source to a sink via a communication channel. In this sense, information transfer is equivalent to data transmission which highlights more practical, technical aspects.

The information transfer rate may or may not be equal to the transmission modulation rate.

Bidirectional information transfer is called information exchange.

Non-technical meaning
In a non-technical context, information transfer is sometimes used to signify knowledge transfer or teaching.

See also
Federal Standard 1037C in support of MIL-STD-188.

Data transmission